Alison Pargeter (born 31 May 1972) is an English actress who played the roles of stalker Sarah Cairns in the BBC soap opera EastEnders, Mary Slessor in an 11-part television series of Mary Slessor, the Nag's Head barmaid called Val in the BBC Only Fools and Horses prequel Rock & Chips, She later played the role of Margaret Campbell in the third series of STARZ's Outlander, and also as a Kindly Old Woman in the HBO series The Nevers.

Career

Television appearances

Pargeter has made several guest appearances over the years, she has appeared in the Channel 5 Horror series Urban Gothic, the long-running ITV police drama series The Bill, Strange, Dalziel and Pascoe, and Holby City.

Between that time in 2004, she played a recurring role which was Martin Fowler's stalker Sarah Cairns in EastEnders, who appeared in 21 episodes, She was a barmaid who worked in Angie's Den club, and tried to split Martin Fowler up from his wife Sonia following a drunken night together. She exited the series following a fight where she accidentally stabbed Martin and got committed to a mental institution.

Since leaving EastEnders she moved back, and returned to doing guest appearances again, including The Courtroom, Love Soup, Channel 4 comedy series Green Wing, and returned for a second guest appearance in The Bill.

In 2008, Pargeter played another major the role called Mary Slessor in the Mary Slessor an 11-part television series.

Since then, she went back to doing guest appearances onces again, such as the Channel 4 comedy series Pete Versus Life, Rock & Chips, The Crimson Petal and the White, 24: Live Another Day inciding three guest roles in Doctors, Crashing, Outlander, The Dumping Ground, four guest roles in Casualty, Vanity Fair, Chernobyl, Catch-22, Father Brown, The Crown and most recently The Nevers. 

In 2004 she appeared in the television advertisement for John Smith's bitter "Annie, I'm not your Daddy" which starred Peter Kay.  Also in 2012 she appeared in a television advertisement for Miracle Whip: Village. she later played a role as a house wife for TV commercial Volvic Juicy drink back in 2015, at the end of 2018, she appeared as playing the role of mother of three children with her husband as part of an Sainsburys Christmas Advert, on a really important mission complete their Christmas shopping, In time for Christmas, and more recently, she played the role of a Vampire for an Birds Eye Commercial, advertising veggie burgers.

Films
Pargeter has appeared in seven films such as Calendar Girls (2003), Mad George (2004), Angel (2007), Reuniting the Rubins (2010), The National Union of Space People (2016), The Little Stranger (2018) and the upcoming movie called Shafted, which is currently still in pre-production.

Theatre
During 1997, Pargeter starred in the stage play Dinosaur Rock, and between 1999 to 2000, she ended up spending a year touring in the musical Grease playing the role of Jan who was one of the Pink Ladies.

Pargeter was a member of the Stephen Joseph Theatre Company in Scarborough, North Yorkshire, where she was directed by Sir Alan Ayckbourn in a trilogy of plays known collectively as Damsels in Distress, which subsequently transferred to the West End. For this, she won Best Newcomer in the Critics' Circle Theatre Awards and was nominated for an Evening Standard award, Manchester Evening News Award and a Whatsonstage Award.

Later parts include Sugar Daddies, again written and directed by Alan Ayckbourn; She Stoops to Conquer at the Royal Exchange, Manchester, for which she was nominated for a second Manchester Evening News award;

In June 2005, she played title role of Effie Gray in The Countess, playing opposite Nick Moran at the Criterion Theatre, Piccadilly.

In 2008 she recorded the voice of 'Wendy Darling' in a musical adaptation of Peter Pan with the music lyrics by Dallison/Wherry and was also narrated by Joe Parquale as 'Smee'.

Pargeter has starred in several Christmas Pantomimes for children over the years, she appeared in Alice in Wonderland, Jack and the Beanstalk and Cinderella.

In July 2011 Pargeter played the role of Gertrude Riall at the Manchester International Festival in a Victoria Wood's play called That Day We Sang.

Between February and June 2013, Pargeter went on A National Tour, touring eleven theatres around parts of the UK, and played the role of Eliante in the Roger McGough's play called The Misanthrope and on 10 March 2013 The Misanthrope also went live from the Everyman Playhouse and English Touring Theatre on BBC Radio 3.

Between 2013 and 2016, she appeared in two more stage plays including Sex Cells and her more recent was All My Sons.

Filmography

Films

TV

External links

Living people
People from Oxford
1972 births
English soap opera actresses
English television actresses
20th-century English actresses
21st-century English actresses